Chandra Danette Cheeseborough (later Shellman, born January 10, 1959) is a retired American sprinter. She won two gold medals and a silver at the 1984 Summer Olympics in Los Angeles.

Track and field
Cheeseborough broke onto the international track scene at age 16 by winning two gold medals at the 1975 Pan American Games, taking the 200 m in an American record time of 22.77 seconds. In 1976, she set the World junior record at 11.13 seconds by placing second at the U.S. Olympic trials, she then placed sixth in that event at the Montreal Olympic Games.

Cheeseborough graduated from Jean Ribault High School in Jacksonville, Florida in 1977, where she set the still standing NFHS national high school records in both the 100 yard (10.3) and 220 yard (23.3) dashes.  The federation converted record-keeping to metric distances shortly afterward.  Next she attended Tennessee State, where she was a member of national championship teams that set world indoor records of 1:08.9 minutes in the 640-yard relay and 1:47.17 in the 800-yard sprint medley relay. She qualified for the 1980 U.S. Olympic team but was unable to compete due to the 1980 Summer Olympics boycott. She did however receive one of 461 Congressional Gold Medals created especially for the spurned athletes. She won the national indoor 200-yard dash in 1979, 1981, 1982 and 1983. 

Cheeseborough's breakthrough year in the 400 m came in 1984, when she set two American records in the event, then placed second in the Los Angeles Olympics in a career best of 49.05. The 49.05 still ranks her as the #10 performer of all time.  She made history at the 1984 Games when she became the first woman to win gold medals in both relays, which were held less than an hour apart. Cheeseborough also became only the second athlete, after Paavo Nurmi 60 years earlier, to win two separate Olympic running events in a single day.

Coach
Cheeseborough later became a coach and returned to Tennessee State. She was named head coach of both men and women in 1999. She also has served as an assistant coach for the U.S. team at the 1999 Junior Pan-Am Championships. In March 2007 it was announced that Cheeseborough would be the assistant coach for the 2008 Olympic team. Cheeseborough coached the sprints and hurdles for the 2008 Beijing Olympics.  As head women’s track and cross-country coach at Tennessee State, her alma mater, she led the Tigerbelles to six Ohio Valley Conference championships.

References

External links

 
 
 

1959 births
Sportspeople from Jacksonville, Florida
Track and field athletes from Florida
American female sprinters
Living people
Tennessee State Lady Tigers track and field athletes
Olympic gold medalists for the United States in track and field
Olympic silver medalists for the United States in track and field
Athletes (track and field) at the 1975 Pan American Games
Athletes (track and field) at the 1979 Pan American Games
Athletes (track and field) at the 1976 Summer Olympics
Athletes (track and field) at the 1984 Summer Olympics
Pan American Games gold medalists for the United States
Medalists at the 1984 Summer Olympics
Pan American Games medalists in athletics (track and field)
Congressional Gold Medal recipients
Goodwill Games medalists in athletics
USA Outdoor Track and Field Championships winners
Competitors at the 1986 Goodwill Games
Medalists at the 1975 Pan American Games
Medalists at the 1979 Pan American Games
Olympic female sprinters